The surname Bush is an English surname, derived from either the Old English word "busc" or the Old Norse "buskr," both of which mean "bush," a shrub.

Variations on the English spelling "Bush" include: Bushe, Bosch, Boush, Boushe, Busch, Bussche, Buscher, Bysh, and Bysshe.

The Bush family has held a family seat in Yorkshire, Northern England.

People with the Bush name

Members of the United States political Bush family

 Obadiah Newcomb Bush (1797–1851), father of
 James Smith Bush (1825–1889), father of
 Samuel P. Bush (1863–1948), father of
 Prescott Bush (1895–1972), senator and financier
 George H. W. Bush (1924–2018), 41st president of the United States, First Lady Barbara Bush (1925–2018)
 George W. Bush (born 1946), 43rd president of the United States, First Lady Laura Bush (born 1946)
 Barbara Bush (born 1981)
 Jenna Bush Hager (born 1981), TV reporter
 Jeb Bush (born 1953), Governor of Florida 1999–2007, married to Columba Bush (born 1953)
 George P. Bush (born 1976), real estate developer and investor, Commissioner of the Texas General Land Office
 Noelle Lucila Bush (born 1977)
 John Ellis "Jebby" Bush Jr. (born 1983)
 Neil Bush (born 1955), businessman, former banker
 Lauren Bush (born 1984), fashion model and designer
 Pierce Bush
 Marvin Bush (born 1956), financier
 Dorothy Bush Koch (born 1959)
 Jonathan Bush (1931–2021), banker and political fundraiser and his son:
 Billy Bush (born 1971), radio and television host
 William H. T. Bush (1938–2018), banker and venture capitalist

Other people

 Alan Bush (1900–1995), English classical composer and pianist
 A. S. Bush (1837–1917), American politician 
 Archie Bush (umpire), American professional baseball umpire
 Bryan Bush (1925–2008), English footballer
 Charles P. Bush (1809–1857), American politician from Michigan
 Chris Bush (disambiguation), multiple people
 Curtis Bush (born 1962), American kickboxer
 Cori Bush (born 1976), American politician from Missouri
 Darren Bush (born 1974), American baseball coach
 Dave Bush (born 1979), Major League Baseball pitcher
 Devin Bush Jr. (born 1998), American football player
 Donie Bush (1887–1972), baseball player and manager of the early 20th century
 Duncan Bush (1946–2017), Welsh poet, novelist and dramatist
 Edith Bush (1882–1977), American mathematician, sister of Vannevar
 Ethel Bush (1916–2016), British police officer awarded a George Medal
 Garnet Bush (1882–1919), baseball umpire
 Geoffrey Bush (1920–1998), English composer
 George Bush (disambiguation)
 George Washington Bush (1779–1863), black pioneer settler of the Pacific Northwest, Oregon & Washington
 Grand L. Bush (born 1955), American actor
 Irving T. Bush  (1869–1948), American businessman
 James Bush (1907 – 1987), American actor 
 Lt James Bush M.C. (1891–1917), World War I flying ace
 Jason Eugene "Gunny" Bush (born 1974), convicted to death for the murders of Raul and Brisenia Flores
 Jess Bush, (born 1992), Australian actress and artist
 John Bush (disambiguation), multiple people
 Kate Bush (born 1958), English musician
 Lesley Bush  (born 1947), Olympic diver
 Luis Bush, American Christian strategist-activist
 Marian Spore Bush (1878–1946), American artist and dentist
 Mary Bucci Bush (born 1949), American novelist
 Matt Bush (disambiguation), multiple people
 Michael Bush (born 1984), American football running back
 Norton Bush (1834–1894), American landscape painter
 Percy Bush (1879–1955), Welsh rugby union player
 Reggie Bush (born 1985), American football player
 Robert Bush (disambiguation), multiple people
 Roger Bush (1918–2000), Australian Methodist minister and media personality
 Sam Bush (born 1952), American musician
 Sarah Bush Lincoln (1788–1869), stepmother of Abraham Lincoln
 Sophia Bush (born 1982), American actress
 Stan Bush (born 1953), American singer
 Stephen J. Bush, Welsh actor
 Vannevar Bush (1890–1974), American scientist, brother of Edith
 Wesley G. Bush (born c. 1961), American business executive
 William Bush (disambiguation), multiple people
 Zhan Bush (born 1993), Russian figure skater

See also
 Busch (surname)

Notes & references 

English-language surnames
Surnames of English origin